This is the results breakdown of the local elections held in Catalonia on 3 April 1979. The following tables show detailed results in the autonomous community's most populous municipalities, sorted alphabetically.

Overall

City control
The following table lists party control in the most populous municipalities, including provincial capitals (shown in bold).

Municipalities

Badalona
Population: 229,780

Barcelona

Population: 1,754,579

Cornellá
Population: 91,563

Gerona
Population: 83,929

Hospitalet
Population: 289,747

Lérida
Population: 106,190

Mataró
Population: 96,942

Reus
Population: 82,407

Sabadell
Population: 187,247

Sant Cugat del Vallès
Population: 31,748

Santa Coloma de Gramanet
Population: 140,613

Tarragona
Population: 108,131

Tarrasa
Population: 157,442

References

Catalonia
1979